Shallow Life is the fifth studio album by Italian gothic metal band Lacuna Coil. The album was released in April 2009 in Europe and North America through Century Media Records and EMI. As of September 2009, it has sold over 75,000 copies in the U.S. and 225,000 worldwide.

Background
The album was recorded in autumn 2008 at a studio in Los Angeles with producer Don Gilmore. According to magazine Rock Sound the album would have some Arabic influences. Scabbia noted that the album "feels more rock" and that it is "the perfect mixture between our old European sound and something more modern...some of its very heavy. The most amazing this is, we've been able to improve everything about Lacuna Coil without taking away anything good or doing something that doesn't belong." Shallow Life was reportedly set to be the band's first concept album, containing references toward superficial lifestyles in the world today. The song "Spellbound" was debuted live at the Soundwave Music Festival in February 2009. The song "Not Enough" was released as a free download on the Italian Music website XL with the backstage of Spellbound video on April 1, 2009. In the beginning of April the song "I'm Not Afraid" was released as airplay on Russian radios.

On April 8, 2009 Lacuna Coil posted all 12 tracks from their album to listen to on their MySpace profile page for one week only.

On April 14, 2009 the band created a poll on their MySpace profile for fans to choose the second single, involving nine songs from Shallow Life.

Shallow Life was re-released as a double disc deluxe edition with new artwork from January 22–27, 2010 in Europe and February 22, 2010 in North America. The bonus disc contains live and acoustic recordings and previously unreleased studio tracks.

Reception

The Album received mixed reviews from music critics. Allmusic writer, gave a mixed review to the album and rated it as two-and-a-half stars out of five and wrote: "In all fairness, Shallow Life, does come on very much as expected based on Lacuna Coils preceding career arc, and many observers would argue that backtracking isn't the solution either if a band is to prosper in the long run -- but it may have to be here, given the underwhelming sales and vociferous critical backlash bestowed upon the album." Kerrang! magazine gave it three out of five, stating: "It may not stand along Karmacode in ten years' time...but it is an album for today." Rock Sound gave them eight out of ten saying that the album is "Edgier, racier and more accessible than almost anything they've done to date, 'Shallow Life' is the sound of a band that's reaping the rewards of over a decade in the business". Despite the mixed reaction, the track "Wide Awake" received near universal praise.

Track listing

Bonus tracks

Special Edition (Double disc)

Singles
 "Spellbound": "Spellbound" was released on March 20, 2009, via digital download. No physical release is scheduled. "Spellbound" was released on the "Liquid Metal" and "Octane" stations of Sirius XM satellite radio on February 14 and was released officially on their MySpace on February 24.
 "I Like It": The single was chosen after a poll on their MySpace profile, involving nine other songs from Shallow Life. The video for "I Like It" was filmed in May. The music video was shot in Kansas City by the American director Kevin James Custer and it was released June 29, 2009.  Despite being released as a single, however, it has never been performed live.
 "I Won't Tell You": The single was released on October 5, 2009 on American mainstream rock radio stations. The video for "I Won't Tell You" was filmed on December 5 in Milan by the Italian director SaKu, who also directed the video for "Spellbound." The music video was released on the band's official MySpace page on January 12, 2010.
 "Wide Awake": The single was released on November 30, 2009 for Italian radio stations as a special single for the holidays.

Credits and personnel
 
 
Lacuna Coil
 Andrea Ferro - male vocals
 Cristina Scabbia - female vocals
 Marco "Maus" Biazzi - lead guitar
 Cristiano "Pizza" Migliore - rhythm guitar
 Marco Coti Zelati - bass, keyboards
 Cristiano "CriZ" Mozzati - drums

Production
 Don Gilmore - production and engineering
 Mark Kiczula- assistant recording engineering
 Josh Newell- studio assistance
 Recorded at NRG studios, North Hollywood, CA
 Mastered by Ted Jensen at Sterling Sound

Other personnel
 Chris Denner - band photography
 Art direction, design & production by Stefan Wibbeke, Media Logistics GmbH, medialogistics.com

Publishing
 All music by: Lacuna Coil
 All keyboards by: Marco Coti Zelati
 All lyrics by: Lacuna Coil / Don Gilmore
 All music and lyrics published by Lacuna Coil / High Speed Chase, ASCAP
 Administered by Kobalt

Other credits
 Management: Adam (DOOM) Sewell for Riot Rock Management
 Booking: Paul Ryan (UK), Tim Borror (US) for The Agency Group
 Legal Representation: Michael Toorock, Toorock and Rosen, LLP
 Tour Management: Mark "Gus" Guy

Charts

Release history

References

2009 albums
Lacuna Coil albums
Century Media Records albums
EMI Records albums